Mina Cheon (born 1973) is a Korean American new media artist, scholar, and educator. Since 1997, she has been living between Baltimore, New York, and Seoul.

Early life and education
Cheon was born in Seoul, South Korea. Being the daughter of a South Korean diplomat and cultural attache, she grew up in the cities of Seoul, New York, Copenhagen, and Ottawa.

Her B.F.A. in painting is from Ewha Womans University in Seoul, South Korea; M.F.A. in painting is from Hoffberger School of Painting, Maryland Institute College of Art (MICA); and M.F.A. in Imaging Digital Arts from University of Maryland, Baltimore County (UMBC). She also received a PhD in Philosophy of Media and Communications from the European Graduate School, European University for Interdisciplinary Studies, Switzerland in 2008 and is currently on the faculty of Maryland Institute College of Art (MICA).

Teaching
One of Cheon's educational contributions has been the international art program and exchange that she has led with architect, Gabriel Kroiz, and between American and Korean art, architecture, and design students. She has directed international art education since 2004, working with universities in Seoul such as Hongik University, Korea National University of Arts, and with Ewha Womans University in 2010, taking students from Maryland Institute College of Art (MICA) and Morgan State University to South Korea. Cheon expanded her teaching horizons from just art to teaching in the departments of Foundation; Art History; Language, Literature, and Culture; and Interactive Media. She was also the founder and director of the summer study abroad program MICA Korea that was held each summer in Seoul, Korea between 2004 and 2007.

Exhibitions
At times appearing as a North Korean social realist painter Kim Il Soon, artist Mina Cheon advocates for global peace and Korean unification as a social activist political pop artist. Cheon's "POLIPOP: Political Pop Art" has been exhibited internationally, which includes painting, new media art, interactive media, installation art, and performance art work.

Her solo exhibitions include: "Happy North Korean Children" at Trunk Gallery, Seoul; "Choco-Pie Propaganda" at Ethan Cohen New York Gallery; "POLIPOP" at Sungkok Art Museum, Seoul, Korea (2012); "Polipop and Paintings" at the Maryland Art Place, Baltimore, Maryland; "Groundless" at Lance Fung Gallery, New York, (2002); "Dizz/placement" at Insa Art Space, Art Council, Seoul, Korea; "Addressing Dolls" at C.Grimalids Gallery, Baltimore, Maryland (named as "Best Solo Exhibition" by City Paper). Diamonds Light Baltimore is a collaborative project built by Mina Cheon and Gabriel Kroiz composed of fifteen unique diamond shaped sculptures of different shapes and sizes. These sculptures are large enough for the audience to walk inside and through it. The diamond sculptures are made of LED lights to highlight the unique shape of the object.

Publications
Cheon's Shamanism + Cyberspace (Atropos Press, New York and Dresden) was published in 2009. Cheon's article co-authored with Gabriel Kroiz "The Konglish Critique" in Beyond Critique edited by Susan Waters-Eller and Joseph J. Basile (Maisonneuve Press, College Park, MD) was published in 2013. Co-authored by Cheon and Kroiz' Combat: Sports and Military (Culture Bank Publishing, Seoul, South Korea;  . -03600) was published in 2010. Cheon's chaired panel "Magic and Media" in Media-N: Journal of the New Media Caucus (Media-N, NMC, USA) was published in 2012.

Her current artistic research involves delving into racism in published visual arts encompassing Asian nations that are found in images and popular culture.

References

External links

Homepage
Faculty Mina Cheon interviewed by Sarah Caldwell, WBALTV, NBC
Feature Article by Tim Smith in The Sun
Mina Cheon interview about Polipop, on Arirang, Global TV
Article by Cheon in the Baltimore Sun
Mina Cheon was awarded the 2010 Martin Luther King Unity Week Award at MICA*http://www.mica.edu/News/MICAs_Unity_Week_Takes_Place_Through_Friday_Jan_22.html
Mina Cheon's book Shamanism + Cyberspace. http://www.mica.edu/News/Faculty_Mina_Cheon_99_Publishes_First_Book.html
Mina Cheon's participation on the panel, The Martin Luther King Junior Special on the Marc Steiner Show*http://www.steinershow.org/radio/the-marc-steiner-show/january-18-2010
Mina Cheon's interview on Maryland Morning*http://mdmorn.wordpress.com/2010/01/17/118102/
Review of Mina Cheon's Artist Keynote Address Speech for the MICA MLK Unity Week*http://www.mica.edu/News/MICA_Faculty_Member_Mina_Cheon_99_Delivers_Unity_Week_Artist_Keynote_Address_in_Dedication_to_Flores_McGarrell_97_98.html
Mina Cheon's nomination for Baker Artist Award*https://web.archive.org/web/20110725034532/http://bakerartistawards.org/nomination/view/minacheon
Review of Dizz/placement by Alex Castro on the Urbanite*https://web.archive.org/web/20110721155859/http://www.urbanitebaltimore.com/baltimore/eye-to-eye/Content?oid=1246768
Mina Cheon collaborates with Markand Thakar*https://web.archive.org/web/20110721160001/http://www.urbanitebaltimore.com/project/2008/teams/team7/
Mina Cheon's participation to I am Korean American*http://iamkoreanamerican.com/2010/03/08/mina-cheon/

1973 births
Living people
Artists from Baltimore
Artists from New York City
People from Seoul
South Korean contemporary artists
South Korean educators
South Korean emigrants to the United States
South Korean women artists
20th-century South Korean educators
Maryland Institute College of Art alumni
Ewha Womans University alumni
European Graduate School alumni
University of Maryland, Baltimore County alumni
Maryland Institute College of Art faculty
South Korean expatriates in Switzerland
American expatriates in Switzerland